Kęstutis Lupeikis  (born 22 July 1962 in Vilnius) is a Lithuanian architect and painter.

Lupeikis has received state grants for his work in both fields, which has been shown at 10 solo and 38 group exhibitions in Lithuania and Germany. He designed the Public procurator's office in Vilnius.

See also
List of Lithuanian painters

References
 KLAP, Kęstutis Lupeikis architectural projects. Lithuanian Union of Architects. Accessed 2010-11-19.
  Pastatai sostinėje perteikia neįprastas architektūrines idėjas. Delfi.lt. Accessed 2010-11-19.
Universal Lithuanian Encyclopedia

Lithuanian architects
Lithuanian painters
1962 births
Living people
Vilnius Gediminas Technical University alumni
Artists from Vilnius